Frederic Murray may refer to:

 Feg Murray (1894–1973), American athlete
 Frederic Murray (priest), Archdeacon of Belize